The eighth season of the Reborn! anime series is a compilation of episodes that aired between April 3, 2010 and June 19, 2010 on TV Tokyo. Titled as Katekyō Hitman Reborn! in Japan, the Japanese television series is directed by Kenichi Imaizumi, and produced and animated by Artland. The plot, based on the Reborn! manga by Akira Amano, follows Tsuna Sawada, the future boss of the infamous Vongola Mafia family and the final battle against the Milliefiore family.

Three pieces of theme music are used for the episodes: a single opening theme and two ending themes. The opening theme is "Listen to the Stereo!!" by Going Under Ground. Titled , its first DVD volume was released on November 26, 2010. The second and third volumes were released on December 15, 2010 and January 28, 2011, respectively.

On March 21, 2009, Japan's d-rights production company collaborated with the anime-streaming website called Crunchyroll in order to begin streaming subbed episodes of the Japanese-dubbed series worldwide. New episodes are available to everyone a week after its airing in Japan.


Episode list

References
General
 

Specific

External links 
 Official Reborn! website 
 Official anime website 
 TV Tokyo's official anime website 

2010 Japanese television seasons
Season 8